The following is a list of crusader states that were independent during some point in history. This list includes crusader states in Outremer, Frankokratia, and in the Baltics.

List

Notes

References 

 
Crusader